Fakhri Odeh (Arabic: فخري عودة; born January 1, 1941), Kuwaiti actor.

Works

Plays 
Chaos (1974)

Series TV 
darb al zalik
al alkdar (1977)

Program 
salamtak (1980)

Dubbing 
Future Boy Conan as Lepka (1981)

References

1941 births
Living people
Kuwaiti male actors
Kuwaiti male stage actors
Kuwaiti male film actors
20th-century Kuwaiti male actors
21st-century Kuwaiti male actors